Kobe Chinese School is a Chinese international school in Chuo-ku, Kobe, Japan. It is one of two Mainland China-oriented schools in Japan, the other being Yokohama Yamate Chinese School. It provides elementary and junior high school education in grades 1-9 and offers first choice in admission to children of alumni. The second choice is priority to Chinese people. The school established a policy of trying to minimize enrollment of Japanese students in 2000. In 2008 about 40% of the students were Japanese nationals who are ethnic Chinese.

Notable people
Shūhei Nomura
Inukai Tsuyoshi, taught at the school
Chin Shunshin, taught at the school

See also
 Chinese people in Japan
 Education in Kobe

References

Further reading

Available online:
 Baba, Hiroko (馬場 裕子; Ritsumeikan University大学院先端総合学術研究科). "An Analysis of Internationalization and Multiculturalism at Chinese Schools : Yokohama Yamate Chinese School and Kobe Chinese School" (大陸系中華学校による国際化・多文化化への試み : 横浜山手中華学校と神戸中華同文学校を事例に; Archive). Core Ethics (コア・エシックス) 10, 203-214, 2014. Ritsumeikan University. See profile at CiNii. See profile at JAIRO. English abstract available.
 Wang, Xin (王 鑫; PhD student, Hyogo University of Teacher Education Joint Graduate School of Science of School Education). "Changes of the Overseas-Chinese school and regional characteristics in Japan: mainly about Kobe Chinese School and Yokohama Yamate Chinese School" (日本における華僑学校の変遷とその地域的特徴—神戸中華同文学校と横浜山手中華学校を中心に; Archive). Journal for the Science of Schooling (教育実践学論集) (10), 125-133, 2009-03. 兵庫教育大学大学院連合学校教育学研究科. See profile at CiNii. See profile at HEART (Hyokyo Educational and Academic Resources for Teachers) of Hyogo University of Teacher Education. English abstract available.

Not available online:
 Suwaki, Ichiro (洲脇 一郎 Suwaki Ichirō; Kobe Shinwa Women's University). "The Problem of Removal of Kobe Chuka Dobun Gakko (Kobe Chinese School) : Solution by Mutual Concessions" (神戸中華同文学校の立ち退き問題 : 互譲による解決 (山根耕平教授・森川直教授ご退任記念号)). Studies in Childhood Education (神戸親和女子大学児童教育学研究) 33, 41-53, 2014-03. Kobe Shinwa Women's University. See profile at CiNii.
 Hsu Chiung-Feng. "The Postwar Overseas Chinese policy of the Republic of China and the reconstruction of Kobe Chinese Tongwen School" (戦後中華民国政府の華僑政策と神戸中華同文学校の再建). Journal of Chinese Overseas Studies (華僑華人研究) (6), 63-80, 2009. 日本華僑華人学会. See profile at CiNii.
 陳 來幸. "Multicultural Coexistence and Identity of Kobe Chinese School" (神戸中華同文学校にみる多文化共生とアイデンティティ (特集 華人とは誰か : 教育とアイデンティティ)). 華僑華人研究 (8), 71-74, 2011. 日本華僑華人学会. See profile at CiNii.
 石川 朝子. "The educational messages of ethnic identity conveyed in overseas Chinese school: based on an analysis of the "School News Report" and teacher interviews in an overseas Chinese school in Kobe" (中華学校で伝達されるエスニック・アイデンティティのメッセージ—神戸中華同文学校の「通訊」と教員インタビュー分析から). Journal of Chinese Overseas Studies (華僑華人研究) (7), 105-122, 2010. 日本華僑華人学会. See profile at CiNii.
 牛 志玲. "Theory and practice of education for international understanding in Kobe Chinese School" (神戸中華同文学校における国際理解教育の理論と実践). Global Education (グローバル教育) 11, 62-77, 2009-03. 日本グローバル教育学会. See profile at CiNii.
 山本 須美子. "日本における華僑教育に関する教育人類学的考察--神戸中華同文学校の事例を中心に." Research Bulletin (九州大学比較教育文化研究施設紀要) (43), p59-80, 1992-03. 九州大学教育学部附属比較教育文化研究施設. See profile at CiNii.

External links
 Kobe Chinese School /

Elementary schools in Japan
International schools in Kobe
Chinese international schools in Japan